Porn 'n' Chicken was a club based at Yale University. The secret society blazed briefly in the headlines in 2001 when members announced plans to make their own pornographic film on campus starring other Yale students, although the film was never released or even completed.  Nevertheless, a fictionalized version of the club's experiences was produced as a TV movie titled Porn 'n Chicken and broadcast on Comedy Central. A Porn 'n Chicken club has been confirmed to exist at the University of Virginia.

In the news 
In the October 2000 Yale Herald article by Joseph Ax that is the first known public discussion of the club, it was mentioned that the club planned to shoot its own porno film that spring. The film's name, later infamous, had already been selected -- The StaXXX. "Everyone is invited to audition: undergrads, TAs, professors, local high school students," one of the club members explained. "We're pretty serious about this film. We'd like to have a screening at UPIX."

In November 2000 they posted around campus for actors and actresses, and even filmed their first scenes in late January (one of their actresses was taking a semester in Nepal during the bulk of the filming, so her scenes were completed early). Blurry snapshots of the action appeared in the Yale Daily News. A week later the New York Times had the story, and a national media frenzy ensued.

The New Yorker, Fox News Boston, Hustler, The New York Post, Brill's Content, The Village Voice, Premiere Magazine, The London Evening Standard, and others all inquired for information. Club organizers claimed that they were getting irritated by all the interview requests, and shut out MTV, the New York Post, and the New Haven Register.

According to the stories that followed, many students wanted to be involved, but few were willing to let their names or faces appear in the film. The movie's plot accommodated this by following the induction of members into one of Yale's secret societies, allowing the actors to wear masks.

The StaXXX 
Towards the end of the school year, nobody saw any filming going on. Word leaked that the scenes that had been filmed first had since been destroyed at the request of one of the actresses. Sentiment shifted to the hypothesis that the film, if not the entire club, was merely a prank. Students who had been contacted earlier in the year heard nothing more. Posters were hung in April advertising a preliminary screening of the film, but the public was not invited and many doubted that any footage existed. 

Club members insisted The StaXXX existed, and even asserted that a sequel was in the works. This film, to be called Dubya, would depict the sexual exploits of U.S. President George W. Bush during his years at Yale. The budding filmmakers offered that they were being represented by the Creative Artists Agency. When contacted, CAA acknowledged that it was representing a Yale student named James Ponsoldt in connection with PnC, but Ponsoldt vehemently denied having anything to do with the club.

PnC (or people pretending to be PnC) continued to host events on campus, including a movie screening and lecture by Village Voice sex columnist Tristan Taormino.

A trailer for The StaXXX was ultimately released and was shown before a screening at the Yale Film Society, but no other footage ever emerged.

In media 

Ponsoldt, along with other Yale alumni, sold the Porn 'n Chicken stories to Comedy Central, which filmed on the Columbia University campus. The movie premiered on Comedy Central on October 13, 2002. Porn stars Jenna Jameson and Ron Jeremy appear in the film as guest speakers at a club meeting.

References

Sources 
 The New Yorker, "Talk of the Town," October 14, 2002

New York Times, January 26, 2001

The New York Observer February 15, 2001

The Daily Pennsylvanian, September 19, 2002
Ball State Daily News, October 14, 2002

External links 
 

2002 television films
2002 films
2002 comedy films
American television films
Yale University
Films set in 1996
Films set in Columbia University
2000s English-language films